Elton is a civil parish in Cheshire West and Chester, England.  It contains six buildings that are recorded in the National Heritage List for England as designated listed buildings, all of which are at Grade II.  This grade is the lowest of the three gradings given to listed buildings and is applied to "buildings of national importance and special interest".

See also
Listed buildings in Dunham-on-the-Hill
Listed buildings in Ellesmere Port
Listed buildings in Hapsford
Listed buildings in Helsby
Listed buildings in Ince
Listed buildings in Thornton-le-Moors

References

Listed buildings in Cheshire West and Chester
Lists of listed buildings in Cheshire